Scott D. Davis is a new age pianist from Dixon, California. He has released five albums. He considers his style to be similar to pianists David Lanz, George Winston, Yanni, and Michael Nyman.

Music 
Davis' music is featured on Whisperings: Solo Piano Radio, an internet based broadcast that draws over 500,000 listeners each month. Two of his tracks have also been chosen to be included on Pure Touch Volume 2, part of a nationally released series of sampler CDs.  New Age Reporter described him by saying "his exuberance and originality are invigorating and his upbeat attitude contagious" while David Lanz has called his music "heavy mellow." Davis is a Metallica fan and has published an album, Pianotarium, of Metallica covers.

Discography 
 Piano & Woodwinds (2001)
 Tahoma (2003)
 Winter Journey (2004)
 Rockfluence (2006)
 Pianotarium: Piano Tribute to Metallica (2007)

References

External links 
Official Website
Scott D. Davis on YouTube
Whisperings: Solo Piano Radio
CD reviews at MainlyPiano.com
Interview with Kathy Parsons

New-age pianists
Living people
1973 births
People from Dixon, California
American male pianists
21st-century American pianists
21st-century American male musicians